CSFL may refer to:

 Central States Football League, a former NAIA football conference
 Central States Football League (1948–1953), a minor professional American football league in which the Racine Raiders played
 Central States Football League (1962–1975), a minor professional American football league in which the Racine Raiders played
 Collegiate Sprint Football League, one of two governing bodies for sprint football, an American football variation
 Cerebrospinal fluid leak